The 1993 Liga Semi-Pro Divisyen 1season is the fifth season of Liga Semi-Pro Divisyen 1. A total of 10 teams participated in the season.

Kedah, Pulau Pinang and Kelantan were promoted from 1992 Liga Semi-Pro Divisyen 2.

Under the new format, only the top six teams in Divisyen 1 and the Divisyen 2 champions and runners-up will be involved in the Malaysia Cup. Malaysia Cup was played from the quarter-final stage, scheduled for November after the league was finished. The Malaysia Cup quarter-final and semi-final matches will be played on a home and away basis.

After the end of the season, both division of Malaysian Semi-Pro Football League were merged to create the Malaysian first professional football league, the Malaysia Premier League starting from 1994 season. Kedah ended up as the league winner for this season.

Teams
10 teams competing in the last season of Liga Semi-Pro Divisyen 1.

 Kedah (1993 Liga Semi-Pro Divisyen 1 champions)
 Sarawak
 Perak
 Pahang
 Johor
 Kelantan
 Penang
 Terengganu
 Kuala Lumpur
 Negeri Sembilan

Division 1

Champions

References

Liga Semi-Pro Divisyen 1 seasons
1
Malaysia